Dirty Radio (stylized as DiRTY RADiO) is a Dance-R&B band from Vancouver, British Columbia, formed in 2010. The band was founded by members Farshad Edalat (lead vocalist, percussion, songwriter) known by his stage name Shadi, Zachary Forbes (DJ, producer, songwriter) known by his stage name Waspy, and Anthony Dolhai (mixer, producer, songwriter) known by his stage name Tonez. The band have released three full-length studio albums ("Debut", "Cassette"  and "Pleasures"), one EP (LiCK 1.0), and a number of singles including "Numbers", "True Love", and "My Life".

In 2015, the band began releasing a series of digital singles which were well-received online and garnered millions of plays on Soundcloud and Spotify. 

DiRTY RADiO is known for crafting a synthesis of progressive pop, R&B and electronic music and have released a number of collaborations on international labels such as Spinnin' Records, Majestic Casual, Fools Gold, Mad Decent, and Partyfine.

They have also toured and shared the stage with acts such as Dragonette, Funk Hunters, Miami Horror, k-os and Lights.

History 
Originally formed as a production trio consisting of Shadi, Waspy and Tonez, the group has since evolved their live show, with Shadi and Waspy taking the stage as an electronic duo. Their rich musical backgrounds have equipped DR with an undeniable ability to light up a crowd. Shadi grew up studying jazz and playing soul and R&B while Waspy was playing drums in punk and metal bands. This distinct history gives them a unique perspective on how they approach making music together. Starting with Waspy's beats and building from there with Shadi's hypnotic melodies, DR is hands on with every aspect of the creation and production of their work. This attention to  detail has enabled DR to collaborate with respected producers and DJs from around the world. Tracks with Young Franco (Australia), Mike Mago (Holland), Jean Tonique (France), Favulous (Italy), Sleepy Tom (Canada), and Just Kiddin (UK) have garnered online love and international airplay from radio stations such as BBC Radio1Extra and Triple J Australia.

Dirty Radio released their first full-length album "Debut" in August, 2010 with the singles "My Heart ft. Sherry St. Germain" and "Wanna Ride" both charting on the Billboard Canadian Emerging Artists Chart.  In 2011, follow-up single "Ground Shake" was released to radio in Canada, receiving regular rotation on stations nationwide. In March 2012, "Pressure"  from Debut was sampled by Rusko and released on his album Songs, receiving acclaim from Pitchfork Media who in their review of the album highlighted the band's "commanding vocal performance."

Band members 

 Shadi - vocals, percussion
 Tonez - piano, synthesizers
 Waspy - drums, keyboards, production

Touring

Discography

Albums

Singles

Awards and nominations 

|-
|rowspan="3"|2013
|Pop Artist or Group of the Year
|Sirius XM Indie Awards
|
|-
|Dance/Urban/Rhythmic Song of the Year "Found You"
|Canadian Radio Music Awards
|
|-
|Urban Recording of the Year - Cassette
|Western Canadian Music Awards
|
|-
|2016
|Electronic/Dance Artist of the Year
|Western Canadian Music Awards
|
|-
|2017
|Electronic/Dance Artist of the Year
|Western Canadian Music Awards
|
|}

References

External links 
 

Musical groups from Vancouver
Musical groups established in 2010
2010 establishments in British Columbia
Canadian dance music groups